The 1915 Uxbridge by-election was held on 10 November 1915.  The by-election was held due to the Conservative MP, Charles Thomas Mills, being killed in action in the First World War.  It was won by his brother, the Conservative candidate Arthur Mills, who was unopposed.

References 

Uxbridge by-election
Uxbridge by-election
20th century in Middlesex
Uxbridge
Uxbridge,1915
Uxbridge,1915
Unopposed by-elections to the Parliament of the United Kingdom in English constituencies
Uxbridge by-election